The FBI's Ten Most Wanted Fugitives during the 2020s is a list, maintained for an eighth decade, of the Ten Most Wanted Fugitives of the United States Federal Bureau of Investigation. At any given time, the FBI is actively searching for 12,000 fugitives. , six new fugitives have been added to the list.

FBI 10 Most Wanted Fugitives to begin the 2020s

The FBI in the past has identified individuals by the sequence number in which each individual has appeared on the list. Some individuals have even appeared twice, and often a sequence number was permanently assigned to an individual suspect who was soon caught, captured, or simply removed, before his or her appearance could be published on the publicly released list. In those cases, the public would see only gaps in the number sequence reported by the FBI. For convenient reference, the wanted suspect's sequence number and date of entry on the FBI list appear below, whenever possible.

The following fugitives made up the top Ten list to begin the 2020s:

FBI Most Wanted Fugitives added during the 2020s
It was not until June 2020 before any of the previous fugitives were captured. A second fugitive was caught in August 2020, and the first replacement was named in October 2020. Despite being captured in August 2020, the second fugitive was not replaced until September 2021. The list includes (in FBI list appearance sequence order):

2020–present

FBI directors in the 2020s
Christopher A. Wray (2017–present)

References

External links
Current FBI Top Ten Most Wanted Fugitives

2020s in the United States